Fortunes of War may refer to:
 
Fortunes of War (novel series), a 1960 series by Olivia Manning
Fortunes of War (TV series), a 1987 television adaptation of the above
 Fortunes of War (film) a 1994 action film produced by and starring Matt Salinger
"Fortunes of War", a song by heavy metal band Iron Maiden from their 1995 album The X Factor
"Fortunes of War", a song by prog rock singer Fish from his 1994 album Suits